Josiah Johnson may refer to:

Josiah Johnson (footballer) (born 1939), Liberian footballer
Josiah Johnson (pilot) (1832–1919), American pilot
Josiah Johnson Sr. (1795–1871), American pilot

See also
Josiah S. Johnston (1784–1833), American politician